Jeff Lawson may refer to:

 Jeff Lawson, co-founder of distributed.net
 Jeff Lawson, co-founder and CEO of Twilio
 Jeff Lawson (footballer) (born 1944), Australian rules footballer for Richmond

See also
Geoff Lawson (disambiguation)